The Federal Employees Health Benefits (FEHB) Program is a system of "managed competition" through which employee health benefits are provided to civilian government employees and annuitants of the United States government.    
The government contributes 72% of the weighted average premium of all plans, not to exceed 75% of the premium for any one plan (calculated separately for individual and family coverage).

The FEHB program allows some insurance companies, employee associations, and labor unions to market health insurance plans to governmental employees. The program is administered by the United States Office of Personnel Management (OPM).

History
The program was created in 1960. Employer sponsorship of health insurance in the United States became prevalent during World War II, as one of the few ways by which employers could escape wage and price control limitations on employee wages. The government originally proposed a system that would revolve around a dominant government-directed plan, but unions and employee associations, which had sponsored their own plans, protested. Reflecting the political pressure thus created, the Congress modified the Executive Branch proposal and all existing plans were "grandfathered" into the program. Thus, through what was essentially a historical accident and a political compromise, a system of competition among health plans driven by consumer choices was created.

Plans
Choices among health plans are available to employees during an "open enrollment" period, or "open season," after which the employee will be covered fully in any plan he or she chooses without limitations regarding pre-existing conditions. After the annual enrollment, changes can be made only upon a "qualifying life event" such as marriage, divorce, adoption or birth of a child, or change in employment status of a spouse, until the next annual open season, during which employees can enroll, disenroll, or change from one plan to another. The exact dates of the open season change from year to year, but are usually from the Monday of the second full week in November through Monday, the second full week of December. Enrollment begins at or near the beginning of the calendar year, and lasts until a different plan choice is made in a subsequent open season or through a qualifying life event. In practice, there is a great deal of inertia in enrollment, and only about 5 percent of employees change plans in most open seasons.

Premiums vary from plan to plan and are paid in part by the employer (the U. S. government agency that the employee works for or, for annuitants, OPM) and the remainder by the employee. The employer pays an amount up to 72 percent of the average plan premium for self-only or family coverage (not to exceed 75 percent of the premium for the selected plan), and the employee pays the rest. This dollar amount is recalculated each year as health care costs and plans' premiums increase. Certain employees (such as postal workers) have a higher portion of their premiums paid as the result of collective bargaining agreements. The precise percentage of the average paid by the employer is relatively unimportant to the design of this program and has changed over time to become more generous. What is important is that it is a "capped premium" design, in which the entire marginal cost of joining a plan with a premium near, at, or above the all-plan average is borne by the enrollee.

In 2010 about 250 plans participate in the program. About 20 plans are nationwide or almost nationwide, such as the ones offered by some employee unions such as the National Association of Letter Carriers, by some employee associations such as GEHA, and by national insurance companies such as Aetna and the Blue Cross and Blue Shield Association on behalf of its member companies. There are about 230 locally available plans, almost all HMOs. The FEHB program is open to most federal employees.  For example, as of 2014 members of the United States Congress and their staff are excluded from the FEHB and required to purchase health insurance through the health care exchange due to the Affordable Care Act.  However, the federal government provides a premium contribution for the purchase of this health insurance.  The FEHBP's cost is about $40 billion in 2010, including both premiums and out-of-pocket costs. It enrolls about four million employees and annuitants and, with their dependents, eight million persons in total.

The FEHB program relies on consumer choices among competing private plans to determine costs, premiums, benefits, and service. This model is in sharp contrast to that used by original Medicare. In Medicare, premiums, benefits, and payment rates are all centrally determined by law or regulation (there is no bargaining and no reliance on volume discounts in original Medicare; these parameters are set by fiat). Some have criticized the FEHB model because neither the monopsony power nor purchasing power of the federal government is utilized to control costs. This controversy is similar to that which surrounded legislation for the Medicare Prescription Drug Coverage passed during the George W. Bush administration.

One of the most prominent features of the FEHB program is the choices it allows. There are three broad types of plans: fee-for-service and preferred provider organization (PPO), usually offered in combination; HMOs; and high-deductible health plans and other consumer-driven plans. In the Washington, D.C., metropolitan area, plans open to all federal employees and annuitants include 10 fee-for-service and PPO plans, seven HMOs, and eight high-deductible and consumer-driven plans. A similar number of choices is offered in almost all large metropolitan areas, and in many smaller cities and rural areas. An evaluation of the FEHB program found that Open Season movement reduces premiums on average by about 1 percent compared to prior enrollment patterns, despite the tendency of enrollees to remain in current plans without considering alternative choices.

In the FEHB program the federal government sets minimal standards that, if met by an insurance company, allows it to participate in the program. The result is numerous competing insurance plans that are available to federal employees. Local plans have ready access to participation in the program, but the underlying statute prohibits entry of new national plans. Because OPM requires plans to price offerings closely to the health care costs of enrollees, and to offer comprehensive benefits, there is broad similarity in plan offerings. However, total premiums can vary substantially, and in 2010 the lowest cost plan option has a self-only premium cost of about $2,800 and the highest cost plan option for self-only enrollment is about $7,200. As an example of benefit variation, a cap of about $5,000 a year on potential out-of-pocket costs for self-only enrollment is found in a number of plans, but in some plans the cap may reach $15,000 or more (HMOs typically have no cap, but control potential cost exposure by using copayments).

The FEHB program has often been proposed as a model for national health insurance and sometimes as a program that could directly enroll the uninsured. These proposals began within its first decade and have continued ever since. Economist Alain Enthoven explicitly built a proposal for a system of "managed competition" as a national health reform decades ago, and has continued promoting the idea ever since. A version of this proposal was recently adopted by the Netherlands. In the 2004 presidential campaign, Senator John Kerry proposed opening enrollment in this plan to all Americans. In enacting the Medicare Modernization Act in 2003, the Congress explicitly modeled the reformed Medicare Advantage program and the new Medicare Part D Prescription Drug program after the FEHB program. One of the prominent proposals for health reform in the United States, the proposed bipartisan Wyden-Bennett Act is largely modeled after the FEHB program, as have recent "Republican Alternative" proposals by Representative Paul Ryan.

See also
 Health insurance in the United States

Notes

References 

Anderson, Odin, and Joel May. 1971. The Federal Employees Health Benefits Program, 1961–1968: A Model for National Health Insurance? In Perspectives. Chicago: Center for Health Administration Studies, University of Chicago.
Cain, Harry. 1999. Moving Medicare to the FEHBP Model, or How to Make an Elephant Fly. Health Affairs 18 (4): 25–39. http://www.healthaffairs.org. Retrieved 2020-01-28.
Enthoven, Alain. 1980. Health Plan: The Only Practical Solution to the Soaring Cost of Medical Care. Reading, Mass.: Addison-Wesley.
Francis, Walton. Putting Medicare Consumers in Charge: Lessons from the FEHBP. 2009. Washington, D.C.: American Enterprise Institute.
Francis, Walton, and the editors of Washington Consumers' CHECKBOOK. 2009 and prior years. CHECKBOOK's Guide to Health Plans for Federal Employees. Washington, D.C.: Center for the Study of Services. Also available online at http://www.guidetohealthplans.org. Retrieved 2010-01-28.
Gruber, Jonathan. March 2009. Choosing a Medicare Part D Plan: Are Medicare Beneficiaries Choosing Low-Cost Plans? Henry J. Kaiser Family Foundation. http://www.kff.org/medicare/upload/7864.pdf. Retrieved 2010-01-28.
U.S. Office of Personnel Management Web Site for Federal Employee Health Plans. http://www.opm.gov/insure/health. Retrieved 2010-01-28.

External links
 Insurance Programs offered by the Office of Personnel Management, including health, dental, vision, life, flexible spending accounts, and long term care
Official website of the FEHB program

United States Office of Personnel Management
Health insurance in the United States